The Michigan Supreme Court is the highest court in the U.S. state of Michigan. It is Michigan's court of last resort and consists of seven justices. The Court is located in the Michigan Hall of Justice at 925 Ottawa Street in Lansing, the state capital.

Operations
Each year, the Court receives approximately 2,000 new case filings. In most cases, the litigants seek review of Michigan Court of Appeals decisions, but the Supreme Court also hears cases of attorney misconduct (through a bifurcated disciplinary system comprising an investigation and prosecution agency – the Attorney Grievance Commission – and a separate adjudicative agency – the Attorney Discipline Board), judicial misconduct (through the Judicial Tenure Commission), as well as a small number of matters over which the Court has original jurisdiction.

The Court issues a decision by order or opinion in all cases filed with it. Opinions and orders of the Court are reported in an official publication, Michigan Reports, as well as in Thomson West's privately published North Western Reporter.

Administration of the courts
The Court's other duties include overseeing the operations of all state trial courts. It is assisted in this endeavor by the State Court Administrative Office, one of its agencies. The Court's responsibilities also include a public comment process for changes to court rules, rules of evidence and other administrative matters. The court has broad superintending control power over all the state courts in Michigan.

Article 6, Section 30 of the Michigan Constitution creates the Michigan Judicial Tenure Commission. This is an agency within the judiciary, having jurisdiction over allegations of judicial misconduct, misbehavior, and infirmity. The Supreme Court is given original, superintending control power, and appellate jurisdiction over the issue of penalty (up to and including removal of judges from office).

History
The Michigan Supreme Court can be dated back to the Supreme Court of Michigan Territory, established in 1805 with three justices. These justices served for indefinite terms. In 1823, the terms of justices were limited to four years.

The Michigan Supreme Court was the only court created by the first Michigan constitution in 1835. It had three members and each also oversaw one of the three judicial circuits, located in Detroit, Ann Arbor and Kalamazoo. The court needed a quorum of two to operate and members were appointed to seven-year terms by the governor with the consent of the senate. In 1838, Justice William A. Fletcher proposed a new plan for the court that the legislature approved. This increased the number of circuits to four and thus expanded the bench to four justices, but left the quorum at two.

In 1848, the court was expanded to five justices and the 1850 Michigan constitution provided that they be elected for six-year terms. In 1858, the Circuit Courts were split from the Supreme Court, so justices now only served on the Michigan Supreme Court and reduced its size to only four justices, one of whom was the Chief Justice.

In 1887, the court was expanded to five justices each serving for ten years. The court was again expanded in 1903 to eight justices serving terms of eight years. In 1964, the new state constitution provided that the next justice to leave the court would not be replaced to reduce the court to seven members, which was achieved when Justice Theodore Souris declined to run for re-election in 1968, leaving the court with seven members since January 1, 1969.

Composition
The Supreme Court consists of seven justices who are elected to eight-year terms. Candidates are nominated by political parties and are elected on a nonpartisan ballot. Supreme Court candidates must be qualified electors, licensed to practice law in Michigan for at least five years, and under 70 years of age at the time of election. Vacancies are filled by appointment of the Governor until the next general election. Every two years, the justices elect a member of the Court to serve as Chief Justice.

The Michigan Constitution allows vacancies on the state Supreme Court to be initially filled by the Governor, with that appointee serving until the next general election, at which time the elected winner is seated to fill the remaining portion of the vacated term.

Current justices

Following the 2012 election, the court had a 4–3 conservative Republican majority, with Robert P. Young Jr. serving as Chief Justice. After the resignation of Justice Diane Hathaway and appointment of David Viviano in 2013, there was a 5–2 Republican majority. After the 2018 election, the court reverted to a 4–3 conservative Republican majority with the election of Megan Cavanagh. 

In 2020, Bridget Mary McCormack was re-elected as Chief Justice and Elizabeth M. Welch was elected as Justice, giving the Democrats a 4–3 majority on the court starting January 1, 2021. This also made the court majority female for the fourth time in state history.

The current justices of the Michigan Supreme Court are:

See also

 Judiciary of Michigan

References

Further reading

External links
 Michigan Supreme Court
 Michigan Supreme Court Commentary
 Michigan Supreme Court Historical Society

 
Michigan state courts
Buildings and structures in Lansing, Michigan
1837 establishments in Michigan
Legal history of Michigan
Michigan
Courts and tribunals established in 1837